Three ships of the French Navy have borne the name Majestueux ("Majestic"):
 Majestueux (1757), an unfinished three-decker
 , a 110-gun ship of the line
 , a 120-gun ship of the line, was renamed Majestueux in 1803.

French Navy ship names